Don Carlos, Prince of Spain is a 1676 tragedy by the English writer Thomas Otway. It portrays the relationship between Philip II of Spain and his son and heir Carlos, Prince of Asturias.

It was staged by the Duke's Company at the Dorset Garden Theatre. The cast featured Thomas Betterton as Philip II, William Smith as Don Carlos, Henry Harris as Don John, John Crosby as Marquis of Posa, Matthew Medbourne as Rui Gomez, Henry Norris as Officer of the Guards, Mary Lee as Queen of Spain, Anne Shadwell as Duchess of Eboli.

References

Bibliography
 Van Lennep, W. The London Stage, 1660-1800: Volume One, 1660-1700. Southern Illinois University Press, 1960.

1676 plays
West End plays
Tragedy plays
Plays by Thomas Otway
Plays set in Spain
Cultural depictions of Spanish kings
Plays set in the 16th century